William Ernest Kenny (August 20, 1907 in Vermilion, Alberta – June 2, 1970) was a Canadian professional ice hockey defenceman.

Ernest played for the New York Rangers and Chicago Black Hawks in the National Hockey League.  He later played in many minor hockey leagues through Canada.

References

External links

1907 births
1970 deaths
Canadian ice hockey defencemen
Chicago Blackhawks players
Ice hockey people from Alberta
New York Rangers players
People from the County of Vermilion River